U.S. Route 50 (US 50) is a transcontinental highway which stretches from Ocean City, Maryland to West Sacramento, California. In the U.S. state of Virginia, US 50 extends  from the border with Washington, D.C. at a Potomac River crossing at Rosslyn in Arlington County to the West Virginia state line near Gore in Frederick County.

History
US 50, also known in modern times for most of its mileage in Virginia as the John Mosby Highway and for a part as Lee-Jackson Memorial Highway, is steeped in history as a travelway. Native Americans first created it as they followed seasonally migrating game from the Potomac River to the Shenandoah Valley. As English colonists expanded westward in the late 17th and 18th centuries, the Indian trail gradually became a more clearly defined roadway. First on horseback, and then in stage coaches and wagons, in colonial times, travelers from the ports of Alexandria and Georgetown (then in Maryland) followed it to Winchester at the lower end of the Shenandoah Valley for trade. Along the way, small settlements sprang up which provided lodging and provisions for travelers and trade centers for local farmers.

During the American Civil War, the roads which became US 50 were an important travelway for troops, and were the site of significant battles and skirmishes. Among these, the Battle of Chantilly, the Battle of Aldie, as well as Arlington National Cemetery were all located close by.

During the 19th century, the Virginia Board of Public Works encouraged and helped finance internal transportation improvements such as canals, turnpikes, and some of the earlier railroads. In 1806, the Little River Turnpike opened  of macadamized "paved" road from Alexandria to Aldie and the Aldie and Ashby's Gap Turnpike was formed in 1810 to operate a toll road westward to the crest of the Blue Ridge Mountains at Ashby's Gap. The Winchester and Berry's Ferry Turnpike extended from the Ashby's Gap to Winchester.

In 1922, these three privately owned turnpikes were taken over by the Commonwealth of Virginia and became State Route 36. Then in November 1926 the route became part of US Route 50 as designated in the United States Numbered Highway System. At Winchester, the northern end of the Valley Pike, another historic trail, turnpike and toll road pathway steeped in history, intersected US 50 and several other important older roads. (The Valley Pike ran up the Shenandoah Valley southward and was operated in its later years by future Virginia governor and U.S. Senator Harry Flood Byrd before it too was acquired by the state and became U.S. Route 11).

US Route 50 was one of the major east–west transcontinental highways in the grid system of the lower 48 states planned in the 1920s as a successor to the National Auto Trails System. It extended from San Francisco, California to Annapolis, Maryland (later extended to Ocean City, Maryland). Route 50 crosses Virginia near the state's northern borders with Maryland and West Virginia. The east–west major routes in the 1920s national grid system were those with two digit numbers ending with a zero (i.e. US 10, US 20, etc.). Virginia's other east–west highway of this type is US 60, which extends in modern times from Virginia Beach across the middle section of the state to exit west of Covington.

Route description

Frederick County and Winchester
U.S. Route 50 enters the state from the West Virginia border, descending from the Appalachian Mountains in Frederick County, the most northern Virginia county, and carrying the name of Northwest Turnpike. It is on a winding, two lane road until it passes the former lumbering town of Gore, at which point it widens to a four-lane highway. It eventually crosses State Route 37 and enters the independent city of Winchester.

Winchester was long the transportation hub of the lower Shenandoah Valley in Virginia. Today, US 50 meets Interstate 81 there, as well as US 11, US 522, and State Route 7. U.S. Route 17 joins US 50 here from its national northern terminus as the route exits the city to the east and crosses the Shenandoah River.

Paris, Ashby Gap, Clarke County
After crossing the Shenandoah River, the divided four-laned roadway which serves as combined U.S. Routes 17 and 50 ascends into Clarke County and crosses US 340 close to Boyce, a few miles south of Berryville, the county seat.

Just west of Paris, the highway crosses a ridge of the Blue Ridge Mountains at a place known as Ashby Gap. Named for Thomas Ashby, this wind gap was a strategic point for both sides in the American Civil War because whichever side controlled the Gap also controlled access to the northern end of the Shenandoah Valley from the east. In those days before modern communications, Ashbys Gap was also an important location for the military Signal Corps to send and receive visual communications. A few miles west of Upperville, U.S. Route 17 finally separates from US 50 at Paris.

Fauquier and Loudoun counties
West of Fairfax County, US 50 in Virginia is generally known as the John Mosby Highway. During the American Civil War, Colonel John Singleton Mosby was a Confederate partisan who operated with great success in this region, gaining status as a local folk-hero. The roadway reaches the Town of Upperville, straddles a county line and dipping into Loudoun County along the way. It then passes into the northern edge of Fauquier County.

Upon entering Loudoun County, US 50 exits the Blue Ridge Mountains and enters the Piedmont region. The highway passes across the southeastern portion through the Town of Middleburg, and the communities of Aldie (birthplace of Stonewall Jackson's mother, Julia Beckwith Neale), Gilberts Corner, Arcola, and South Riding. Near Gilberts Corner, it has an intersection with US 15. Starting in Aldie, the highway becomes a 17-mile straightaway until it intersects U.S. 29 in Fairfax City.

Fairfax County, City of Fairfax, Arlington County
Continuing east from the border with Loudoun County, US 50, Lee-Jackson Memorial Highway, travels along the historic Little River Turnpike route.  It passes by the southern edge of Washington Dulles International Airport and the Steven F. Udvar-Hazy Center and through the communities of Chantilly and Fair Oaks.

Shortly after entering the independent city of Fairfax, US 50 leaves the Little River Turnpike route (which continues as Virginia State Route 236) and joins a concurrency with US 29 as Fairfax Boulevard (a new designation, concurrent with the old names Main Street, Lee Highway, and Arlington Boulevard).  US 29 splits from US 50 again just before exiting the City of Fairfax.

From this point east into eastern Fairfax County and Arlington County, US 50 is known as Arlington Boulevard.  The roadway travels roughly across the center of both counties. In Arlington, it serves as the dividing line for addresses in the county. Finally, the route passes near Rosslyn, a high-density business area of Arlington on its trek toward the Theodore Roosevelt Bridge, where it exits Virginia and passes into Washington, D.C. concurrent with Interstate 66.

Future
The Loudoun County Board of Supervisors voted to rename the section of US 50 within Loudoun County from John Mosby Highway to Little River Turnpike on December 7, 2021. This is in an effort to restore historical names and remove segregationist and Confederate symbols throughout the county.

Major intersections

References

External links 

 John Mosby Highway historical markers at The Historical Marker Database

 Virginia
50
Northwestern Turnpike
U.S. Route 050
U.S. Route 050
U.S. Route 050
U.S. Route 050
U.S. Route 050
U.S. Route 050
U.S. Route 050
U.S. Route 050
U.S. Route 050